Piezocera flavipennis is a species of beetle in the family Cerambycidae. It was described by Zajciw in 1970.

References

Piezocerini
Beetles described in 1970